Robert James Hamelin (born November 29, 1967) is a former first baseman and designated hitter in Major League Baseball. From 1993 through 1998, Hamelin played for the Kansas City Royals (1993–96), Detroit Tigers (1997) and Milwaukee Brewers (1998).  He batted and threw left-handed.

In a six-season career, Hamelin posted a .246 batting average with 67 home runs and 209 RBIs in 497 games played. In 1994, at the age of 26, he was the American League Rookie of the Year.  His stint as a professional player was marred by leg injuries, both in the minors and majors. He also suffered from an eye problem.

Playing career

High school and college
After a long and illustrious career in the Randolph Little League, Hamelin's family moved from their home in Randolph, New Jersey to Irvine, California, when he was 12 years old. Hamelin attended Irvine High School where he excelled in both football and baseball and was named the School's Athlete of the Year as a senior.  The University of Notre Dame recruited him to play football, however Hamelin had already decided to pursue a career in baseball.  Hamelin enrolled in Santa Ana College after graduating from high school and played on the school's baseball team. Soon thereafter the young baseball prospect transferred to UCLA, where he continued to play baseball for his new school. In 1987, he played collegiate summer baseball with the Harwich Mariners of the Cape Cod Baseball League.

Major leagues
Hamelin won the 1994 AL Rookie of the Year Award as a member of the Kansas City Royals, when he posted a .282 batting average and hit 24 home runs (earning him the nickname "the hammer") with 65 RBIs during the strike-shortened season.

After the major leagues
Hamelin abruptly quit his professional baseball career while playing in the minor leagues for the Toledo Mud Hens (Detroit Tigers AAA Team) in 1999. After grounding out, he went back to the dugout and told manager Gene Roof, "I'm done", ending his professional baseball career as a player.

After retirement Hamelin was out of professional baseball for several years, owning a manufacturing company. He attended scouting school and returned to professional baseball as a scout for the Washington Nationals and the Toronto Blue Jays.  In 2012, he joined the Major League scouting corps of the Boston Red Sox. His scouting contract was not renewed by the Boston Red Sox for the 2021 season.

Hamelin's 1996 Pinnacle Foil baseball card is commonly referred to as the worst baseball card of all time. In 2019, Hamelin and a collection of his baseball cards were featured in the first episode of SB Nation's two part series "The Bob Emergency", narrated by Jon Bois.

Highlights
 American League and TSN Rookie of the Year awards (1994)
5th in slugging percentage (AL 1994, .599)
5th in OPS (AL 1994, .987)
9th in home runs (AL 1994, 24)

References

External links
, or Baseball Library, or Retrosheet, or Pura Pelota (Venezuelan Winter League)

1967 births
Living people
Baseball City Royals players
Baseball players from California
Baseball players from New Jersey
Boston Red Sox scouts
Detroit Tigers players
Eugene Emeralds players
Harwich Mariners players
Kansas City Royals players
Major League Baseball designated hitters
Major League Baseball first basemen
Major League Baseball Rookie of the Year Award winners
Memphis Chicks players
Milwaukee Brewers players
Omaha Royals players
Santa Ana Dons baseball players
Sportspeople from Elizabeth, New Jersey
Sportspeople from Irvine, California
Tiburones de La Guaira players
American expatriate baseball players in Venezuela
Toledo Mud Hens players
Toronto Blue Jays scouts
UCLA Bruins baseball players
University of California, Los Angeles alumni
Washington Nationals scouts
Alaska Goldpanners of Fairbanks players